This is a list of members of the South Australian House of Assembly from 1959 to 1962, as elected at the 1959 state election:

 The LCL member for Light, George Hambour, died on 25 March 1960. LCL candidate Leslie Nicholson won the resulting by-election on 23 April.
 The Labor member for Frome and Opposition Leader Mick O'Halloran died on 22 September 1960. Labor candidate Tom Casey won the resulting by-election on 5 November.

Members of South Australian parliaments by term
20th-century Australian politicians